is a railway station in the city of Anjō, Aichi, Japan, operated by Meitetsu.

Lines

Station layout
The station is an elevated station with a dual opposed side platforms with the station building underneath. The station is staffed.

Platforms

Adjacent stations

Only some Express trains stop at Hekikai Furui

Station history
Hekikai Electric Railway merged with the Meitetsu Group on May 1, 1944. The tracks were elevated, a new station building was completed and the station renamed to its present name in June 2008.

Passenger statistics
In fiscal 2017, the station was used by an average of 4,711 passengers daily (boarding passengers only).

Surrounding area
 Anjō Minami High School
 Anjō Special Education School

See also
 List of Railway Stations in Japan

References

External links

 Official web page 

Railway stations in Japan opened in 1926
Railway stations in Aichi Prefecture
Stations of Nagoya Railroad
Anjō, Aichi